Hayme Hatun, also known as Hayma Ana (Mother Hayma), was the grandmother of Osman I, founder of the Ottoman Empire and the mother of Ertuğrul Gazi, Gündoğdu and the leader of the Kayı clan of the Oghuz Turks.

Name
Her name appears as Haymana, Hayme Hatun, Hayme Sultan, Ayva Ana  and Ayvana. The name Hayma Ana seems to be an obvious transference of the topographic term haymana, or "prairie", into a personal name.

Burial place

Hayma Ana's last resting place is at Çarşamba, a village near Domaniç, in a pasture area, close to a route connecting the lowlands east of Bursa with Tavşanlı. In 1892 Abdul Hamid II saw the recovery of the tomb of Hayme Ana.

Family
She was of Turkish descent and belonged to a Turkmen family of the Dodurga tribe. She was the grandmother of Osman I, the founder of the Ottoman Empire. She had four sons:

Ertuğrul Gazi (father of Osman I), Bey of Söğüt
Dündar Bey
Gündoğdu Bey
Sungurtekin Bey

In popular culture

Hayme Hatun has been portrayed by Hülya Darcan in Turkish TV series Diriliş: Ertuğrul.

See also
Ottoman family tree (more detailed)
Ottoman Empire
Ottoman dynasty
Halime Hatun

Further reading
İsmail Hakkı Uzunçarşılı, Osmanlı Tarihi, C.I
Selim Yıldız, “Hayme Ana”, Vilayetlerin Sultanlığından Faziletlerin Sultanlığına Osmanlı Devleti, Kütahya 1999, s.40
Mehmed Maksudoğlu, Osmanlı Tarihi, İstanbul 2001, s.21

References

Year of birth unknown
Place of birth unknown
Year of death unknown
13th-century Turkic women
13th-century consorts of Ottoman sultans
Turkic female royalty
Oghuz Turks